is a fictional character in Arc System Works's Guilty Gear video game series. Bridget first appeared in the 2002 video game Guilty Gear X2. In the series, Bridget was born male with a twin brother in a village where the birth of same-sex twins is considered bad luck; therefore, Bridget's family named and raised Bridget as a girl. In young adulthood, Bridget rejected this upbringing and set out to be a man. In adulthood, Bridget found that being a man did not make her happy, and realized her desire to be a woman not for the sake of her village's superstition, but as her own choice of gender identity.

Bridget was created as "a cute character" by Daisuke Ishiwatari, who wanted to vary the cast of Guilty Gear X2, where she was presented as a cross-dressing but self-identifying boy. Due to the character's appearance, Bridget was initially described as female by video game press. When they became aware of her biological sex, reviewers included Bridget on lists of best androgynous and cross-dressing characters, and debated her sexual orientation. Bridget has become a popular character among gamers, and critics have described her as "a memorable character" in the series. Critics praised her appearance in Guilty Gear Strive in which she affirmed her identity as a trans woman.

Concept and design
Ishiwatari created Bridget as "a cute character" since "there were already other good looking and tough characters", but Ishiwatari also "wanted something unconventional" to differentiate Bridget from other fighting games' cute characters; he and his staff decided it "would be interesting to make the character a guy."

Ishawatari also said that Bridget was a difficult character to animate; she "has double the frames of animation" due to her yo-yo's movements. He spent "a very long, very frustrating time trying to get the animation to work", rejecting many versions before studio staff made Bridget "look natural".

Appearances
Bridget was introduced in the third installment of the series, Guilty Gear X2 (2002), where she was presented as a cross-dressing boy wearing a nun's habit. Bridget was born male, one of twin brothers named and raised by their parents as a girl in a British village. They do this to protect her, since the villagers believe that identical twins bring bad luck. In Guilty Gear XX Accent Core Plus (2008), since Bridget feels she has proven her masculinity by defeating several opponents, she decides to become an entertainer. Although she tries to recruit Venom for his talent at pool and I-No for her ability to play electric guitar, both refuse her suggestion. Without money, in one ending Bridget works as a waitress in Jam Kuradoberi's restaurant. In an alternate ending she returns to her birth village, finds that her twin brother has disappeared, and begins searching for him.

Bridget is also a playable character in the spin-offs Guilty Gear Isuka (2004), Dust Strikers (2006), and Judgment (2006).

In 2022, Bridget returned as a DLC character for Guilty Gear Strive. English promotional material such as the Strive website and Bridget's official moveset guide video avoided referring to Bridget with any pronouns. Bridget begins Strives arcade mode storyline presenting as a boy, as Bridget identified in previous games, but is now questioning this cisgender identity. In conversations with Goldlewis Dickinson and Ky Kiske, Bridget expresses feeling unhappy but afraid of making the wrong choice, and the other characters relate to Bridget by sharing their own experiences of hiding secrets and of having the courage to reveal them and live as one's "true self", drawing a comparison to Bridget hiding her transgender identity. At the end of her hard-difficulty mode story, Bridget comes out as a woman to Goldlewis and Ky Kiske.

Reception

In a 2013 poll conducted by Arc System Works, Bridget was voted as the most popular character from the series. Eurogamer called Bridget "[o]ne of Guilty Gears more memorable characters", while Kotakus Brian Ashcraft named her "not only one of Guilty Gears most memorable characters [...] but also one of gaming's", calling her "an iconic character". On the other hand, several websites criticized her appearance and outfit. Bob Mackey of 1UP.com described Bridget's costume as "a cruel prank to question our sexuality and true level of perversion. It's like gaming's version of The Crying Game—but with more crying."

Though the character identified as male during the events of Guilty Gear X2, Bridget was described as a woman in early reports, and has been the subject of discussion about her gender identity because of her androgynous appearance. IGN first described Bridget as a "kooky cross-dressing yoyo-wielding nun character", while GamesRadar called her "a saucy Catholic nun with a penis". She ranked fourth on ZoominGames' Top 5 "Transsexual characters in games" (a ranking that was made before Bridget officially became transgender) and UGO listed her among the "Best Crossdressers" in all media. Further, The Escapist deemed Bridget a pioneer for being a cross-dressing heroic player character, in contrast to video games' many cross-dressing and transgender antagonists, such as Street Fighters Poison.

Although Bridget's sexual orientation is undisclosed, several websites have included the character in LGBT-related articles. On the other hand, Destructoid featured an article "to argue the heterosexuality of Bridget." Despite the controversy, GayGamer.net, JeuxvideoPC and Destructoid agree that Bridget is appreciated by fans; on the Internet, pictures of the character appear with captions such as "Bridget made me gay" and "Everyone is gay for Bridget". This was cited by GamesRadar's staff, which listed her among "characters we'd go gay for". When John McCain sponsored a bill which would require ISPs and possibly websites to alert the government about illegal images of minors—including cartoons—Wired published an article entitled "McCain Not Gay For Bridget".

Gamasutras Zoran Iovanovici ascribed Bridget's popularity to the fact that she is "ultra feminized", adding that "[i]t's no surprise that Bridget has become a fan favorite over the years." Stephen Kelley wrote on VG Chartz that Bridget "appears to be a moe style cute anime character", but "[d]ressed in the provocative nun costume Bridget is suddenly a creepy sex object." Pride St. Clair posted on the Piki Geek blog that Bridget "seemed to be playing towards several prevalent anime fetishes, including the innocent girl and the religious figure who is at once both desirable and chaste", saying that despite seeming "designed as a trap ... Bridget is a sort of touchstone, a basis for a productive discussion about the role gender and fetishism plays in fighting games and modern Japanese culture."

Bridget's debut as a DLC character for Guilty Gear Strive was her first playable appearance in 10 years. Kenneth Shepard of Fanbyte speculated that her extended absence may have been due to uncertainty over how to address her backstory, which he said was presented with homophobic and transphobic tropes in her prior appearances. Her announcement prompted Josh Tolentino of Siliconera to wonder if the developers planned to change her characterization with respect to gender presentation, noting that her official biography on Arc System Works' website avoided using gendered personal pronouns. Critics praised her storyline in which she struggled with her gender identity and finally came out as a trans woman. Shepard acknowledged the challenge of sorting through Bridget's complicated backstory to tell a respectful coming out narrative. Renata Price of Waypoint drew parallels between Bridget's evolution and the increasing presence and acceptance of queer players in the fighting game community. She found Bridget's circuitous path to self-acceptance to be an asset, calling it "messy and genuine in the way that real queer stories are". Price and Shepard connected Bridget's story to Arc System Works' recent treatment of Testament, who identified as nonbinary in a prior DLC for Strive. Some fans alleged that Bridget's trans identity was invented by the translation and localization team and was not present in the Japanese version of the game. In response, series creator Daisuke Ishiwatari and Strive director Akira Katano confirmed that Bridget self-identifies as a woman and uses "she/her" pronouns on the official Guilty Gear website.

References

Female characters in video games
Fictional bounty hunters
Fictional British people in video games
Fictional flexible weapons practitioners
Fictional transgender women
Guilty Gear characters
LGBT characters in video games
Twin characters in video games
Video game characters introduced in 2002